Li Yujie (born 22 August 2001) is a Chinese parataekwondo practitioner. She will compete at the 2020 Summer Paralympics in the –58 kg category, having qualified via World Ranking.

References

External links
 

2001 births
Living people
Chinese female taekwondo practitioners
Taekwondo practitioners at the 2020 Summer Paralympics
Paralympic bronze medalists for China
Paralympic medalists in taekwondo
Medalists at the 2020 Summer Paralympics
21st-century Chinese women